Arūnas Matelis (born 9 April 1961, in Kaunas) is a Lithuanian documentary film director. From 1979 till 1983 Arūnas Matelis studied Mathematics at Vilnius University and later in 1989 graduated from the Lithuanian Music Academy. In 1992, he established one of the first independent film production companies in Lithuania, "Nominum". In 2006 Matelis became a full member of European Film Academy with the right to vote.

Filmography
Pelesos milžinai (1989)
Baltijos kelias (1989)
Dešimt minučių prieš Ikaro skrydį (1991)
Autoportretas (1993)
Iš dar nebaigtų Jeruzalės pasakų (1996)
Pirmasis atsisveikinimas su Rojum (1998)
Priverstinės emigracijos dienoraštis (1999)
Skrydis per Lietuvą arba 510 sekundžių tylos (Flight over Lithuania or 510 seconds of silence) (2000)
Sekmadienis. Evangelija pagal liftininką Albertą (2003)
Prieš parskrendant į žemę (Before Flying Back to Earth) (2005)
Wonderful Losers: A Different World (2017)

Awards

Matelis is one of the recipients of the Lithuanian National Prize of 2005.

"Prieš parskrendant į žemę", the first feature-length documentary by Matelis about children hospitalized with leukemia, is the most highly acclaimed Lithuanian film and is considered one of the best European documentary films of 2005, awarded in numerous festivals:

 Best documentary in Directors Guild of America Awards 2006
 Best Lithuanian Film 2005 by Lithuanian Filmmakers Union 
 Silver Wolf in International Documentary Film Festival Amsterdam (IDFA), 2005
 Golden Dove in International Leipzig Festival for Documentary and Animated Film, 2005 
 Main Prize in Festival Documenta Madrid, 2005 
 "Spirit Award for Documentary" in Brooklyn International Film Festival, 2006
 Grand Prix in Pärnu International Film Festival, 2006
 Special Jury Mention in Silverdocs Festival, 2006
 Veliki pečat international competition award in ZagrebDox Film Festival, 2006

The film is nominated for the European Film Academy best European documentary award of 2005.

Further reading
 Arūnas Matelis: Films Emerge from Sensations in: Lithuanian Cinema: Special Edition for Lithuanian Film Days in Poland 2015, Auksė Kancerevičiūtė [ed.]. Vilnius: Lithuanian Film Centre, 2015. .

References

External links
Personal Website

Lithuanian film directors
Lithuanian documentary film directors
Recipients of the Lithuanian National Prize
Living people
1961 births
Vilnius University alumni
Lithuanian Academy of Music and Theatre alumni
Directors Guild of America Award winners
Film people from Kaunas